Bühl may refer to:

Places
Bühl (Baden), in the district Rastatt, Germany
Bühl (Klettgau), in the municipality of Klettgau, Baden-Württemberg, Germany
Bühl (Tübingen), in the Tübingen district, Baden-Württemberg, Germany
Bühl bei Aarberg, in the Canton of Bern, Switzerland
Sportplatz Bühl, Schaffhausen, Switzerland

People with the surname
Alfons Bühl (1900–1988), German physicist
Hede Bühl (born 1940), German sculptor
Marcus Bühl (born 1977), German politician

See also
Buhl (disambiguation)
Buel (disambiguation)

German-language surnames